A headcrab is a fictional alien parasitoid first appearing as an enemy in Valve's 1998 video game Half-Life, as well as in subsequent games in the Half-Life series.

Attributes

Depiction 
The "common" headcrab variant has a rounded body with four legs for movement: two long, clawed legs at the front and two short legs at the back. Their pair of large frontal claws are frequently utilized in their attacks, and as additional support when standing still. Under the headcrab's body is a large, rounded mouth surrounded by mangled, rigid flesh with a sharp claw-like beak.

Physically, headcrabs are frail: a few bullets or a single strike from the player's melee weapon are sufficient to kill them. They are also relatively slow-moving, and their attacks inflict very little damage. However, they can leap long distances and heights. Headcrabs seek out larger human hosts, which are converted into zombie-like mutants that attack any living life form nearby. The converted humans are more resilient than an ordinary human would be and inherit the headcrab's resilience toward toxic and radioactive materials. Headcrabs and "headcrab zombies" can also catch fire. The games establish that while headcrabs are parasites that prey on humans, they are the prey of the creatures in their homeworld. Bullsquids, Vortigaunts, barnacles, and antlions eat headcrabs. Vortigaunts can be seen cooking them in several locations in-game.

Variations 
While the original Half-Life only included one type of headcrab, as well as baby headcrabs, Half-Life 2 introduced two major variations: a faster variant, and poison headcrabs. Headcrab zombies also receive these variations in Half-Life 2.

Gonarch 
In-universe, the Gonarch is a tall, heavily armored version of a headcrab that appears only once as a boss fight near the end of Half-Life in Xen. The Gonarch appears to function as a hive queen, endlessly spawning infant headcrabs from a bulbous fleshy sack located on its underside. Unlike other types of headcrabs, the Gonarch lacks a mouth on its underside, suggesting it is unable to zombify a host. It was explained by the Half-Life team that the creature was based on the idea of “What if we put a giant testicle on a 20-foot-tall, armored spider?” which may be its namesake, a combination of gonad and monarch.

Fast headcrab 
In-universe, the fast headcrab is a speedier, arachnid-like version of the ordinary headcrab. Its skin is lighter, and has longer legs that allow it to move much faster and climb walls. It does not have a beak, instead using sharp talons at the ends of its legs to latch onto hosts. The zombies it creates are stripped of most of their flesh and muscle. When a fast headcrab is shot off a zombie, it will reveal a completely bare skull with no tissue, which suggests that the fast headcrab completely takes over control of the host's muscles and nervous system, becoming the potential brain for the host/zombie. The resulting zombies are, like the headcrab itself, much faster than ordinary zombies. It also makes the same shriek as its standard cousins.

Poison headcrab 
In-universe, the poison headcrab (also known as the black or venomous headcrab) is slightly larger with dark sage-green-colored skin and thick hairs on the joints of its body and inward-bending legs. It has white bands that encircle its knee joints, wider legs, and a more flattened body, giving it a generally more crab-like appearance. It also makes a chirp at range and a hissing-rattling similar to that of a rattlesnake's tail when it detects a host. Immediately before pouncing, they emit a loud, distinctive shriek. There is also a whipping noise as they pounce. Unlike other headcrabs, the poisonous headcrab has some survival instinct, and retreats if injured. Although it is the slowest-moving version of the headcrab when calm, it can outpace an ordinary headcrab when retreating. Another difference is that the poison headcrab takes a longer time to burn to death than the other types. Poison headcrabs get their name from the neurotoxin they carry, which reduces the player's health to one point instantly on contact, meaning that any third-party damage would kill the player. Gordon's HEV suit provides an antidote that gradually restores lost health over a short period, minus the damage caused by the attack itself. While this makes a single poisonous headcrab difficult to fully kill Gordon, it can make survival more problematic if other enemies are present. Half-Life 2: Raising the Bar notes that play-testers would prioritize poison headcrabs as targets, regardless of any other present or tougher dangers. They will group up on a single host once one is found: the attacking poison headcrab controls the host, while the others use the new host as transportation. Once an enemy is found, the poison headcrabs that use the host as transport will either climb on top of the controlling headcrab and jumps at the player or is thrown by the host at the player. (It is also possible that these additional headcrabs are produced by the host human as a method of reproduction on the part of the primary headcrab).

Headcrab zombie 
In-universe, a headcrab's primary goal is to attach to the head of a suitable host using its mouth (typically covering the face and most of the head). The headcrab then burrows its claws and hind legs into the host and opens up portions of the skull with its mouth, incorporating parts of its biological workings with the motor cortex of the host's nervous system. The victim is thus taken over by the headcrab and mutated into a zombie-like being known as a headcrab zombie, referred to as a "necrotic" by the Combine Overwatch.

Once the headcrab has converted a host into a zombie, the torso of the host is open and organs can be seen. In the first Half-Life, the player can see the texture of the host's skull on the headcrab. However, this was removed in future installments. They are slow-moving but powerful, using their claws to beat their victims to death. They moan almost constantly and growl when they detect prey. In Half-Life 2, they swat loose objects when they run into them, creating potentially lethal projectiles. Half-Life 2 also introduced still-moving zombies which are severed at the waist and crawl toward the player using their arms. Host bodies are catatonic immediately after infestation, and after a while rise to attack.

There are many varations of the headcrab zombie, some are faster, armored, or infected Combine soldiers. These have multiple differences between each other and the normal headcrab zombie. Fast and poison headcrab zombies are created when the respective headcrab attaches itself to a host. A Gonome is unique in that it is a more aggressive and armored mutation of a standard zombie. The "Zombine" is created when a headcrab zombie is created from Combine soldiers. Alyx Vance coins the term "Zombine" for them as a portmanteau of "zombie" and "Combine". The introduction of the Zombine was meant to indicate that, in the wake of the devastation caused by the player in Half-Life 2, what was once a valuable weapon in the Combine arsenal is now just as dangerous to them as it is to regular humans. Along with being able to move faster than normal zombies, zombines also have the unique ability to pull out a live grenade and charge the player, killing themselves in the process.

It is as yet unclear as to what specific function in the Headcrab ecology or reproductive cycle the zombification process serves.

Armoured Headcrab 

Half-Life: Alyx introduces a headcrab variation whose back is covered by a bulletproof shell with dark bulbs and thick spikes. To fight one effectively, the player must target the creature's weak underbelly when the opportunity presents itself, such as when the crab balances on its hind legs in preparation for a jump, or when it lands on its back after jumping, after which it takes a moment for the headcrab to recover its posture. A single pistol hit to the exposed underbelly can kill the creature instantaneously.

Appearances

Half-Life 
Headcrabs are one of the first enemies introduced in Half-Life. They are frequently encountered by players throughout Half-Life and its three expansions, Opposing Force, Blue Shift, and Decay. They also see appearances in the official port of Half-Life, titled Half-Life: Source, as well as the third-party fan modification remake titled Black Mesa. Because the games are remakes or ports, headcrabs play essentially the same role as they do in the original Half-Life.

Half-Life 2 
In Half-Life 2, the Earth-occupying Combine use headcrabs as a biological weapon against the human Resistance. A coffin-like missile is filled with headcrabs and fired from a mortar (as seen in Half-Life 2: Lost Coast). The Combine bombard distant areas with these missiles, and the payload of each shell is released to infest or kill nearby victims. 

Half-Life 2 also featured the first appearance of Dr. Kleiner's "pet" headcrab. Referred to as "Lamarr" (after actress and scientist Hedy Lamarr), it serves as an important plot device for several scenes in the game, most notably in the second chapter of the game, when, by damaging the teleporter that the player is in, causes it to teleport Freeman outside Kleiner's lab, forcing escape through City 17's canals, and also alerting the Combine to the player's presence.

The headcrabs found in Half-Life 2 differ slightly from those found in Half-Life. For example, they are smaller and they no longer have exposed teeth or intestines. In Half-Life 2 headcrabs drown within seconds in deep water and easily survive in contaminated pools, while in Half-Life they can swim in water but die in toxic environments.

Appearances in other media 
 A headcrab is an unlockable character in the Windows, OS X, and Linux versions of Super Meat Boy as an exclusive character for those who purchase the game from Steam.
 A headcrab helm was included in the April 1, 2011, event in Vindictus as an exclusive.
 A headcrab pet was made available in a 2013 update to the action role-playing game Torchlight II. The headcrab pet is available in versions of the game purchased both from Steam and non-Steam storefronts.
 A headcrab cosmetic item was added to Team Fortress 2 in the Summer 2020 Cosmetic Case update.
 A headcrab-like pet was added to the game Among Us around 2019 in the pet bundle.
 A headcrab-like species of enemies called Zurks exist as recurring enemies in the 2022 game Stray.
 A scientist with a Headcrab on his head can be found as a Half-Life reference in a lore room of Dead Cells Prisoners Quarters.

Cultural impact

Reception 

In 2008, the poisonous headcrab was ranked the second most terrifying video game enemy of all time by Cracked due to their venom's ability to drain the players' health to one. In 2011, the poisonous headcrab was ranked number one on the list of "enemies that scuttle and jump at your face" by GamesRadar.

References 

Extraterrestrial characters in video games
Fictional monsters
Fictional parasites and parasitoids
Half-Life characters
Video game species and races
Fictional characters from parallel universes
Zombies and revenants in popular culture
Video game characters introduced in 1998